Septoria dianthi is a fungal plant pathogen infecting carnations.

References

External links
 Index Fungorum
 USDA ARS Fungal Database

dianthi
Fungal plant pathogens and diseases
Ornamental plant pathogens and diseases
Fungi described in 1849